Jaffar Khan (born on March 10, 1981) is a Pakistani former footballer who played as a goalkeeper.

He is currently the keeping coach of Pakistan national football team.

Club career 
Khan came through the Pakistan Army F.C., and selected for the first team in 1998. In 2000, he kept a clean sheet in the PFF President's Cup final against Allied Bank in which they won 1–0. Khan helped them retain the trophy in 2001 until 2006-07 where he set a new goalkeeping record by not conceding a goal for 1,260 minutes.

International career 
He took Pakistan all the way to the final of the 2004 South Asian Games where they beat India 1-0 take Gold. After losing the league in 2004-05 season on the final day, he helped them win the league title the following year. In the 2006 South Asian Games he kept a clean sheet as Pakistan beat Sri Lanka in the finals.

Honours

Club
Pakistan Army
Pakistan Premier League: 2005–06, 2006–07
Pakistan National Football Challenge Cup: 2000, 2001

International
Pakistan
South Asian Games: 2004, 2006

References

External links

1981 births
Living people
Association football goalkeepers
Pakistani footballers
Pakistan international footballers
Pakistan Army officers
pakistan Army F.C. players
Footballers at the 2002 Asian Games
Footballers at the 2006 Asian Games
Footballers at the 2010 Asian Games
South Asian Games gold medalists for Pakistan
Asian Games competitors for Pakistan
South Asian Games medalists in football